Crandall House may refer to the following NRHP-listed houses in the United States:

Prudence Crandall House,  Canterbury, Connecticut
Louis A. Crandall House, Lebanon, Oregon
Lorenzo Crandall House, Pawtucket, Rhode Island
Crandall Houses of Springville, Utah (Clarence L. Crandall House and Nelson D. Crandall House

See also
Crandall Farm Complex, Cazenovia, New York
Lattin-Crandall Octagon Barn, Catherine, New York